Love Everybody is the fourth studio album by American rock band The Presidents of the United States of America. It was released on August 17, 2004, on the band's own label, PUSA Inc. It was the group's final album with Dave Dederer.

When the album was released in the UK, in 2005, it contained four bonus tracks. They included live versions of songs from their debut album, The Presidents of the United States of America, the previously unreleased song "Useless Crushes", and a cover of the Sex Pistols' "Problems".

Critical reception
The Spokesman-Review wrote that the album "finds The Presidents comfortably spinning absurdist fun-rock that recalls its super-successful 1995 self-titled debut." The Stranger called the album "vintage Presidents: infectious exuberance, great hooks, and a renewed sense of pop purpose."

Track listing
All songs by The Presidents of the United States of America, unless otherwise noted.

UK bonus tracks
"Problems (NapsterLive Version)" (Steve Jones, Glen Matlock, Paul Cook, Johnny Rotten) – 1:53
"Lump (Live at End Session in Seattle)" – 2:54
"Naked and Famous (Live at End Session in Seattle)" – 3:51
"Useless Crushes" – 2:44

Personnel
Chris Ballew – basitar, clavinet, synthesizer, sound effects, mixing, editing, engineering, acoustic guitar, guitar, keyboards, harmonica, bass guitar, electric piano
Dave Dederer – guitbass, guitar, acoustic guitar, bass guitar, drums on "Vestina"
Jason Finn – drums, guitbass on "Vestina"
Martin Feveyear – production, engineering, mixing
Conrad Uno – engineering, mixing
Jon Ervie – engineering
Vlado Meller – mastering
Bootsy Holler – cover photo
Kiki Ajidarma – design, packaging

References

2004 albums
Albums produced by Martin Feveyear
The Presidents of the United States of America (band) albums
Self-released albums